Tsuchiya Koitsu (土屋光逸) was an important artist in the Shin-hanga movement. He trained under the ukiyo-e master Kobayashi Kiyochika for 19 years, and initially focused on works depicting scenes from the First Sino-Japanese War. In 1931, at the age of 60, he began work for Shōzaburō Watanabe and his art publishing establishment which also published the work of artists like Kawase Hasui and Yoshida Hiroshi.  His later work incorporated light effects to increase the emotional impact of his art.

Biography 
Born on September 23, 1870, in Hamamatsu, Shizuoka, Japan.  His birth name was either Koichi or Sahei.  He moved to Tokyo at age 15. He first had an apprenticeship for the woodblock carver Matsuzaki, but soon became a student of ukiyo-e master Kiyochika Kobayashi.  He worked for Kiyochika for 19 years and lived in his house.

He initially published prints made during the First Sino-Japanese War, before developing his skill with dramatic light effects, learned from Kiyochika.  Koitsu published through the Watanabe publishing house after Watanabe and Koitsu met at an exhibition commemorating the 17th anniversary of Kiyochika's death.  He also produced prints for publishers Doi Sadaichi, Kawaguchi, Baba Nobuhiko, Tanaka Shobido, and Takemura.

References
 Helen Merritt Modern Japanese Woodblock Prints : The Early Years". Leiden: Hotei Publishing, 2001. .
 Helen Merrit, Nanako Yamada Guide to Modern Japanese Woodblock Prints 1900-1975 University of Hawaii Press, 1995 .
 Saoya Shinora Genkouyoushi Paper. Independent Publisher, 2019

External links

Collection of Tsuchiya Koitsu Prints

Ukiyo-e
1870 births
1949 deaths
Shin hanga artists
20th-century Japanese painters
20th-century printmakers